Arthur Paul Thompson (1 March 1914 – May 1987) was an English cricketer. Thompson was a left-handed batsman who bowled right-arm medium pace. He was born at Leicester, Leicestershire.

Thompson made two first-class appearances for Leicestershire against Derbyshire and Warwickshire in the 1937 County Championship. He scored 11 runs with a high score of 5 in his two matches.

He died in May 1987 in the city of his birth.

References

External links
Arthur Thompson at ESPNcricinfo
Arthur Thompson at CricketArchive

1914 births
1987 deaths
Cricketers from Leicester
English cricketers
Leicestershire cricketers